

Teodor Neaga (1878, Dănceni – 6 December 1941, Penza) was a Bessarabian politician.

Biography 

He served as Member of the Moldovan Parliament (1917–1918).

Gallery

Bibliography 
Gheorghe E. Cojocaru, Sfatul Țării: itinerar, Civitas, Chişinău, 1998, 
Mihai Taşcă, Sfatul Țării şi actualele authorităţi locale, "Timpul de dimineaţă", no. 114 (849), June 27, 2008 (page 16)
 Alexandru Chiriac. Membrii Sfatului Ţării. 1917–1918. Dicţionar, Editura Fundaţiei Culturale Române, București, 2001.

External links 
 Teodor NEAGA, un fiu devotat al Ţării
 Biblio Polis – Vol. 25 (2008) Nr. 1 (Serie nouă)
 Arhiva pentru Sfatul Tarii
 Deputaţii Sfatului Ţării şi Lavrenti Beria

Notes

1878 births
Romanian people of Moldovan descent
1941 deaths
Moldovan MPs 1917–1918
National Liberal Party (Romania) politicians
Members of the Chamber of Deputies (Romania)